is a Japanese construction company, specializing in telecommunication facility construction and engineering. It is a constituent of the Nikkei 225 stock market index.

Renewable energy
The company designed and built a 4.87-MW solar plant in the prefecture of Kyoto for Lixil Group that was launched on September 1, 2015. A year later Comsys started the operation of a floating solar power plant on a reservoir in Kato City, Hyogo Prefecture.

References

External links

  

Construction and civil engineering companies of Japan
Construction and civil engineering companies based in Tokyo
Construction and civil engineering companies established in 2003
Japanese companies established in 2003
Companies listed on the Tokyo Stock Exchange
Japanese brands